James Matthew Huff (born August 25, 1997) is an American professional basketball player for the Washington Wizards of the National Basketball Association (NBA), on a two-way contract with the Capital City Go-Go of the NBA G League. He played college basketball for the Virginia Cavaliers.

High school career
Huff was a four-year varsity basketball player for Voyager Academy in Durham, North Carolina, where he was coached by his father, Mike. On January 21, 2016, as a senior, he became his school's all-time leading scorer. Huff led his team to the Class 1A state title, earning most valuable player honors after recording a triple-double of 14 points, 14 rebounds and 10 blocks in the final. He finished the season averaging 16.3 points, 10.1 rebounds and 5.5 assists per game. A four-star recruit, Huff committed to play college basketball for Virginia.

College career
Huff redshirted his first year to improve his strength and weight. Huff averaged 3.4 points and 1.9 rebounds per game as a freshman. On April 4, 2018, after his freshman season, it was announced that Huff would miss three to four months after undergoing surgery for a torn labrum. As a sophomore, he averaged 4.4 points and 2.1 rebounds in 9.3 minutes per game on the national champion team. On January 18, 2020, Huff scored 17 points and six blocks in a 63–58 win over Georgia Tech. On February 29, Huff recorded 15 points, 10 blocks and nine rebounds in a 52–50 win over Duke. He joined Ralph Sampson as the only players in program history with at least 10 blocks in a game. As a junior, Huff averaged 8.5 points, 6.2 rebounds and two blocks per game, all of which were career-highs. Following the season, he declared for the 2020 NBA draft. After evaluating his decision, he announced he would return to UVA for his senior season on August 1, 2020.

Following the 2020–21 season, Huff declared for the 2021 NBA draft.

Professional career

Los Angeles Lakers (2021–2022)
After going undrafted in the 2021 NBA draft, Huff joined the Washington Wizards for the 2021 NBA Summer League. On September 21, 2021, he signed with the Wizards, but was waived on October 13.

On October 18, 2021, Huff signed a two-way contract with the Los Angeles Lakers. On January 12, 2022, he was waived.

South Bay Lakers (2022–2023)
On January 16, 2022, Huff was re-acquired by the South Bay Lakers.

Huff joined the Los Angeles Lakers' 2022 NBA Summer League roster. In his Summer League debut for the Lakers, Huff scored nine points and seven rebounds in a 100–66 win against the Miami Heat.

On July 27, 2022, Huff signed an Exhibit 10 contract with the Los Angeles Lakers. He was waived on October 15, 2022. He subsequently re-joined South Bay.

Washington Wizards (2023–present) 
On March 2, 2023, Huff signed a two-way contract with the Washington Wizards.

Career statistics

NBA

|-
| style="text-align:left;"| 
| style="text-align:left;"| L.A. Lakers
| 4 || 0 || 5.0 || .000 || .000 || — || 1.0 || .3 || .3 || .3 || .0
|- class="sortbottom"
| style="text-align:center;" colspan="2"| Career
| 4 || 0 || 5.0 || .000 || .000 || — || 1.0 || .3 || .3 || .3 || .0

College

|-
| style="text-align:left;"| 2016–17
| style="text-align:left;"| Virginia
| style="text-align:center;" colspan="11"|  Redshirt
|-
| style="text-align:left;"| 2017–18
| style="text-align:left;"| Virginia
| 12 || 0 || 8.8 || .680 || .286 || .625 || 1.9 || .3 || .1 || 1.2 || 3.4
|-
| style="text-align:left;"| 2018–19
| style="text-align:left;"| Virginia
| 34 || 0 || 9.3 || .604 || .452 || .667 || 2.1 || .2 || .2 || .7 || 4.4
|-
| style="text-align:left;"| 2019–20
| style="text-align:left;"| Virginia
| 30 || 18 || 25.0 || .571 || .358 || .540 || 6.2 || .8 || .4 || 2.0 || 8.5
|-
| style="text-align:left;"| 2020–21
| style="text-align:left;"| Virginia
| 25 || 25 || 27.0 || .585 || .387 || .837 || 7.1 || 1.0 || .5 || 2.6 || 13.0
|- class="sortbottom"
| style="text-align:center;" colspan="2"| Career
| 101 || 43 || 18.3 || .588 || .386 || .679 || 4.5 || .6 || .3 || 1.6 || 7.6

Personal life
Both of Huff's parents are former college basketball players. His father, Mike, played for Pacific Lutheran University, and his mother, Kathy, played for West Virginia. Mike was the director of the Michael W. Krzyzewski Human Performance Laboratory at Duke University.

Huff is a member of the Chi Alpha Christian fellowship at the University of Virginia.

References

External links
Virginia Cavaliers bio

1997 births
Living people
American men's basketball players
Basketball players from North Carolina
Capital City Go-Go players
Centers (basketball)
Los Angeles Lakers players
South Bay Lakers players
Sportspeople from Durham, North Carolina
Undrafted National Basketball Association players
Virginia Cavaliers men's basketball players
United States men's national basketball team players
Washington Wizards players